Bromine mononitrate is an inorganic compound, a salt of bromine and nitric acid with the chemical formula BrNO3. The compound is a yellow liquid, decomposes at temperatures above 0 °C.

Synthesis
1. Reaction of silver nitrate on an alcoholic solution of bromine:

2. Reaction of bromine chloride with chlorine nitrate at low temperatures:

Physical properties
Bromine mononitrate forms an unstable yellow liquid that decomposes at temperatures above 0 °C.

The molecule has the structure BrONO2.

The compound is easily soluble in trichlorofluoromethane and carbon tetrachloride.

Applications
Bromine nitrate plays a role in tropospheric chemistry as it reacts with sulfuric acid.

References

Bromine(I) compounds
Nitrates